Wu Xiangxiang (1912 – 21 September 2007) was a Chinese historian.

Biography
Wu was born in Baisheng Lane, Changde, Hunan, in 1912. His great-grandfather Wu Qingyu and grandfather Wu Jintang (1847 -1937) were small merchants. His father Wu Qilin (1878 - 1937) was a member of the Tongmenghui. In 1922, he moved to Changsha, capital of Hunan province, and entered Chuyi School. Four years later, he attended the Mingde High School. In 1937, he graduated from Peking University, where he majored in history. After university, he worked at the Academia Sinica in Changsha.When the war of resistance against Japanese aggression broke out, he worked in the Ninth War Zone Command of the Kuomintang. At that time, he wrote The Third Changsha Battle and other articles. After war. he had been an editor of Palace Museum and associate professor of Lanzhou University.

After the government of the Republic of China moved to Taiwan, he successively worked as a professor of the Department of History of National Taiwan University, chairman of the Department of History of Nanyang University in Singapore, and professor of the Institute of History of the Chinese Culture University. His students included Li Yongchi and Li Ao.

In November 1962, he was expelled from the Kuomintang. In 1975, he settled down in the United States. In 1996, he returned to mainland China to attend the International Academic Conference on Sun Yat-sen's 130th Birthday. He died in Illinois, on September 21, 2007, aged 95.

Works

References

1912 births
People from Changde
2007 deaths
Historians from Hunan
National University of Peking alumni
Academic staff of Lanzhou University
Academic staff of the National Taiwan University
Academic staff of Nanyang University
Academic staff of the Chinese Culture University
Chinese emigrants to the United States